Rene Michelle Aranda, sometimes credited as Ren Aranda, (born December 6, 1990) is an American actress and singer, best known for Searching and Midnight in the Switchgrass. She has won Best Actress (Silverstate Film Festival, 2018), Best Supporting Actress (LA Edge Film Awards, 2018) and Outstanding Performance by an Actress (Kennedy Center ACT Festival) and finished as a semifinalist in the John F. Kennedy Center for the Performing Arts Center's Irene Ryan scholarship program.

Early life and family
Aranda was born in Whittier, California, to Frank and Cheryl Aranda. She was raised in the nearby city of Chino Hills, where Aranda grew up with older brother Michael Aranda (YouTube creator and musician), older sister Sara Ann Aranda and younger brother Frank Nathan Aranda. Her mother was a self produced singer/songwriter through CD Baby and secretary to the college dean of Natural Sciences and Mathematics at Cal State Fullerton until she died June 27, 2009, after a seven-year battle with breast cancer.

Career

2009–2012: Vocational training 
Aranda is an alumnus of the Los Angeles City College Theater Academy, a three-year, audition-only acting conservatory at which Morgan Freeman, Mark Hamill, Cindy Williams and Bette Davis studied. Just before graduating in 2012, she won the national award "Outstanding Performance by an Actress" in the Kennedy Center American College Theater Festival for her role as Willy the Space Freak in a gender-bent adaptation of Sam Shepard's The Unseen Hand.

For her role as "Van's Sister" in LACC's stage production of Bert V. Royal's Dog Sees God: Confessions of a Teenage Blockhead in 2010, Aranda was nominated for the John F. Kennedy Center for the Performing Arts Irene Ryan scholarship, for which actors compete as a part of the Kennedy Center American College Theater Festival. She made it to the semi finals.

2013–2014: Early career

First invited to the set of network Cinelatino distributed film Smile Now Cry Later as a background actor by a fellow Theater Academy alum, Aranda was later asked to replace a crew member on a subsequent film before being locked in for two more features (Fighting Chance and Cherry Red Kiss) and by the fourth production (Until the Day I Die), she served the company Plus Entertainment as an in-house producer, appearing on screen in each title she helped produce.

Aranda was featured with touring architect Alán Ramiro Manning in the Woodbury University Neo-Tribes Runway Event on May 1 and 2 2013, donning a Jenny Erin Davis (Black Lightning) design of a Bram Stoker's Dracula inspired Elisabeta (Transylvania 1462), wearing Stila makeup.

2018: Music 
In addition to her film and television career, Aranda debuted as a musical artist in 2018, releasing two pop singles a few months apart on Spotify, iTunes, iHeartRadio and other online streaming platforms.

Youth programs and education 
Aranda is a regular volunteer reader and occasional coordinator for Reading to Kids, and ran on the foundation's charity relay team in the Los Angeles Marathon in 2016.

She also participates as a volunteer actor in Young Storytellers "Big Show" productions.

Filmography

Awards and nominations

References

External links 
 
 Rene Michelle Aranda on Fandango 
 Rene Michelle Aranda on Rotten Tomatoes
 Rene Michelle Aranda on Metacritic
Ren Aranda on Spotify
Ren Aranda on iTunes
ReneAranda.com
"Meet Rene Michelle Aranda of Starpark Studios" - Voyage LA Magazine

Living people
1990 births
21st-century American actresses
People from Whittier, California
People from Chino Hills, California
Actresses from California
American film actresses
American television actresses
American actresses of Mexican descent